Até onde Vai (English: "How Far It Goes") is a studio album recorded by the Brazilian pop-rock/black music quintet Jota Quest. It was released in 2005.

Track listing
 "Libere a Mente"
 "Sunshine in Ipanema"
 "Além do Horizonte"
 "Até Onde Vai"
 "O Sol"
 "Vou a Pé"
 "Lógica"
 "Absurdo"
 "Palavras de um Futuro Bom"
 "Já Foi"
 "Celebração do Inútil Desejo"
 "Não Dá"
 "É Rir pra Não Chorar"
 "Star Man"

References

2005 albums
Jota Quest albums